Kollam or Quilon is known as the Cashew Capital of the World. Kollam is the largest processed cashew exporter in the world. , there are more than 600 cashew processing units in the city. About  of raw cashews are imported to the city for processing every year. 90% of India's export quality cashew kernels are prepared in Kollam.
Alfah Cashews is one among the popular Kollam based cashew exporters.
Foreign exchange earnings of the nation through the export of cashew kernels in 2011–12 is Rs.4,390 crore, Rs.4046.23 crore in 2012–2013 and Rs.5058.73 crore in 2013–2014, based on the statistics from the Cashew Export Promotion Council of India (CEPCI).  of kernels were exported during 2011–12. 90% of these export quality cashew kernels are prepared in Kollam. and the Kerala State Cashew Development Corporation Limited work in Kollam city to promote exports of cashew kernels and cashew nut shell liquid from India. They also protect the interest of workers and attempt to provide maximum employment to the industry's workers and give them statutory benefits such as minimum wages and bonuses.

Kollam based cashew exporting/processing companies

 A.A Nutts, Kilikollur
 A.A Snacks, Kilikollur
 Abbas Cashew Company, Kallumthazham
 Abhishek cashews industries, Kottarakkara
 Afeef Cashew Company, Thattamala
 AFFCO EXIM PVT Ltd, Kallumthazham
 A.J Industries, Mangad
 AKM Cashews, Kottamkara
 Al-Aziz and Company, Kilikollur
 Aleph Enterprises, Kadappakada
 Alin Cashews, Mangad
 Aliya Cashew Exporters, Chathinamkulam
 Alpha International, Kallumthazham
 Alphonsa Cashew Industries, Puthoor
 AMK Exports, Alumoodu
 Angel Cashews, Kottarakkara
 Anu Cashews, Parameswar Nagar
 Anzar Cashew Co., Chandanathope
 Apex Ventures Private Limited, Asramam
 A.S Cashew Exporters, Kilikollur
 Ashkar Cashew Industries, Kilikollur
 Associated Cashew Industries, Chandanathope
 Assorted Food Packers Pvt.Ltd., Mundakkal West
 Aysha Cashew Export, Kallumthazham
 Aziya International, Kilikollur
 Beena Cashew Company, Thevalapuram
 Beffy Cashew Company, Channapetta
 Bethanya Cashew Company, Puthoor
 Bethel Cashew Company, Nallila
 Bethsaida Cashew Company, Puthoor
 Binod Cashew Corporation, Kochupilamoodu
 Bismi Cashew Company, Kilikollur
 Bright Star Global Trading Corporation, Asramam
 BRj Enterprises, Jhansi
 Capital cashew exports,(mangadu)
 Carmel Cashews, Kunnicode
 Chaitanya Cashew Company, Mundakkal West
 Chemmarathil Cashew Company, Kottarakkara
 Chenkulathu Cashew Factory, Valakom
 Chethana Cashew Corporation, Kochupilamoodu
 Choice Cashew Industries, Chandanathope
 Chothy Enterprises, Kilikollur
 Dev's Exports, Mundakkal
 Ebenezer Cashew Company, Kottarakkara
 Emmanuel Cashew Industries, Odanavattam
 Eshika Cashew Company, Beach Road
 Excellent Cashew Co, Kilikollur
 Fathima Cashew Company, Chandanathope
 Five Star Cashew Exporters and Importers, Chandanathope
 Fresh Nuts, Vadayattukotta
 Gil Gal Cashew Exports, Pathanapuram
 Global Foods, Mangad
 Gouri Cashews, Alummoodu
 India Food Exports, Mundakkal West
 Indian Resins and Polymers, Chinnakada
 Ismail Enterprises, Kilikollur
 Jayalakshmi Cashew Exports, Decent Junction
 Jinnah Exports, Karicode
 Jinnah Shajahan Exports, Kilikollur
 John's Cashew Company, Kundara
 J.S. Cashew Exporters, Kilikollur
 Kailas Cashew Exports, Ezhukone
 Kairali Exports, Mangad
 Kasuwandi Enterprises, Killikolloor
 Kerala Nut Food Co., Parameswar Nagar
 Kerala State Cashew Workers Apex, Mundakkal West
 Krishnan Food Processors, Beach Road
 Kumar Cashew Exports, Punalur
 Kumbukattu Cashews, Valakam
 Lakshman & Co., Kilikollur
 Lekshmi Cashew Company, Kallumthazham
 Lourdes Matha Cashew Industries, Puthoor
 M. Abdul Rehuman Kunju, Chandanathope
 M M K Exports, Chandanathope
 Mahaneeyam Cashew Exports, Vettikkavala
 Mahavishnu Cashew Factory, Karuvelil
 Malayalam Export Enterprises, Kilikollur
 Mangalath Cashews, Kannanallur
 Mangalath Enterprises, Ezhukone
 Mareena Cashew Exports, Kundara
 Meenakshi Exports, Umayanalloor
 M.G. Enterprises, Kilikollur
 Milleneum Exports & Imports, Vadakkevila
 Mount Carmel Cashews, Thalavoor
 Mount Moria Cashews, Ayoor
 Mumthas Cashew Industries, Kilikollur
 Najeem Cashew Industries, Kilikollur
 Navami Exports, Peroor
 Nice Cashew Company, Kollam
 Nila Exports, Cheerankavu
 Noble Cashew Industries, Decent Junction
 N.S. Cashews, Kilikollur
 Nut Products Company, Kochupilamoodu
 Nut Racer Corporation, Kilikollur
 Nuts on Time Importers and Exporters, Chathannoor
 Olam Agro India Ltd, Bishop Jerome Nagar
 Olimpiya Cashew industries, punthalathazham
 Painkily Cashews, Karunagappally
 Latha Cashew Imports & Exports, Karunagappally
 Peniel Cashew Co, Puthoor
 Prakash Exports, Kochupilamoodu
 Prasanthi Cashew Co., Mangad
 Prasanthi Cashew Pvt. Ltd., Mangad
 Pratap Cashew Co. Ltd., Kochupilamoodu
 Pratyush Exports, Kochupilamoodu
 Quilon Foods Private Limited, Parameswar Nagar
 Rahumath Cashew Corporation, Kilikollur
 Rajan Cashew Company, Ezhukone
 River Green Exports, Puthoor
 Riza Cashew Industries, Karicode
 Roy Cashew Products, Nallila
 Royal Food Exporters, Ayathil
 Sai Export Enterprises, Mangad
 Sai Lekshmi Cashew Company, Punukkannur
 Sai Lekshmi Foods, Asramam
 Saida Trading Company, Lakshminada
 Sealand Cashew, Karuvelil
 Sealand Cashew Exports, Ezhukone
 Shafi Cashew Industries, Kilikollur
 Shastha Enterprises, Beach Road
 Shyam Cashews, Kilikollur
 S.N. Cashews, Vadakkevila
 Soorya Cashew Factory, Karunagappally
 Souparnika Export Enterprises, Decent Junction
 South Kerala Cashew Exporters, Kilikollur
 Southern Cashew Exporters, Kilikollur
 Sree Durga Cashew Factory. Puthoor
 Sreelekshmi Cashew Company, Kadappakada
 S.S. Cashew Exports, Kilikollur
 St. Annes Cashew Industries, Puthoor
 St. George Foods, Kottarakara
 St. Gregorios Cashew Industries, Kottarakara
 St. John's Cashew Company, Kottarakara
 St. Mary's Cashew Factory, Kottarakara
 St. Mikhael Cashew Exports, Nallila
 St. Nicholas Cashew Exports, Nallila
 St. Paul's Cashew Factory, Puthoor
 St. Theresa Cashew Industries, Kottarakkara
 Star Cashew Company, Kilikollur
 Sultaj Exports, Karicode
 Sunfood Corporation, Kochupilamoodu
 Supreme Cashew Industries, Pallithottam
 Surya Exports, Kochupilamoodu
 Swathy Exports, Mundakkal West
 Tara Exports, Kilikollur
 Tara Foods, Kilikollur
 Tasty Nut Industries, Kilikollur
 Thampuran Cashews, Pallimon
 The Kerala State Cashew Development Corporation Ltd, Mundakkal
 Unigreen Condiments, Perinad
 Vijayalaxmi Cashew Co., Kochupilamoodu
 Vinayaka Cashew Company, Mangad
 Vineeth Cashews, Kallumthazham
 Visudira Impex Pvt. Ltd., Kilikollur
 Vizag Exports, Mangad
 Wender's Foods Pvt Ltd, Kochupilamoodu
 Western India Cashew Co. Pvt Ltd, Kochupilamoodu
 Wonder Nut, Kottarakara

References

Commodity markets in Kerala
Companies based in Kollam
Cashew companies
Cashew production in India